Cernay is a railway station in the commune of Ermont (Val-d'Oise department), France. The station is served by trains of the Paris Nord line H and the RER C. It takes around 25 minutes to reach Paris Gare du Nord or Neuilly Porte Maillot stations from Gare de Cernay.

External links

 

Railway stations in Val-d'Oise
Réseau Express Régional stations
Railway stations in France opened in 1988